The "Somasila Dam" is a dam constructed across the Penna River near Somasila, Nellore district, Andhra Pradesh, India.

The reservoir can get water by gravity from the Srisailam reservoir located in Krishna basin. It is the biggest storage reservoir in Penna River basin and can store all the inflows from its catchment area in a normal year. This reservoir can also feed by gravity nearby 72 tmcft gross storage capacity Kandaleru reservoir. Under Indian Rivers Inter-link projects, it is planned to connect the reservoir with the Nagarjunasagar reservoir to augment its water inflows. 

One of the main canals is the Kavali Canal. Kavali canal is feeding to the 52 tanks under system of tanks. It will be covered dagadarthi mandal, sangham mandal, jaladanki mandal and kavali mandal. The total length of the canal is 67.619 km. Kavali Canal is the main source of drinking to Kavali municipality of nearly 1.2 lakh population.

See also
List of dams and reservoirs in Andhra Pradesh
List of dams and reservoirs in India
List of largest reservoirs in India

References

Dams completed in 1989
Dams in Andhra Pradesh
Reservoirs in Andhra Pradesh
Buildings and structures in Nellore district
Geography of Nellore district
1989 establishments in Andhra Pradesh
20th-century architecture in India